Lake Lorraine is a census-designated place in the town of Richmond, Walworth County, Wisconsin, United States. Its population was 338 as of the 2020 census.

Demographics

References

Census-designated places in Walworth County, Wisconsin
Census-designated places in Wisconsin